Eli Jenkins (born August 7, 1994) is an American football quarterback.

Early years
Jenkins attended A. H. Parker High School in Birmingham, Alabama. He committed to play college football at Jacksonville State University.

College career
After redshirting as a freshman in 2012, Jenkins became the starting quarterback for the Jacksonville State Gamecocks football team, a position that he would remain in for the next four years. Jenkins led the Gamecocks to four consecutive FCS playoff appearances from 2013–2016, three consecutive Ohio Valley Conference championships from 2014–2016, and an appearance in the 2015 FCS Championship Game against North Dakota State.

Professional career
Following the 2017 NFL Draft, Jenkins signed as an undrafted free agent with the Los Angeles Chargers. Following the Chargers' trade with the Buffalo Bills to acquire Cardale Jones, Jenkins was released by the Chargers. He signed with the Edmonton Eskimos on December 11, 2017.

In 2018, Jenkins signed for the Birmingham Iron of the Alliance of American Football (AAF). However, he was not selected in the 2019 AAF QB Draft.

References

External links
Jacksonville State Gamecocks bio
Los Angeles Chargers bio

1994 births
Living people
Players of American football from Birmingham, Alabama
Players of Canadian football from Birmingham, Alabama
American football quarterbacks
Canadian football quarterbacks
Jacksonville State Gamecocks football players
Los Angeles Chargers players
Edmonton Elks players
Birmingham Iron players